Caperton is a surname. Notable people with the surname include:

Hugh Caperton (1781–1847), nineteenth-century congressman and planter from Virginia
William Banks Caperton (1855–1941), Admiral of the United States Navy 
William Gaston Caperton III (born 1940), 31st Governor of the U.S. state of West Virginia